The women's javelin throw competition at the 2016 Summer Olympics in Rio de Janeiro, Brazil was held at the Olympic Stadium on 16–18 August. Each athlete received three throws in the qualifying round. All who achieved the qualifying distance progressed to the final. Each finalist was allowed three throws in last round, with the top eight athletes after that point being given three further attempts.

Summary
In the qualifying round, Maria Andrejczyk threw a Polish national record 67.11m, moving her to the # 16 thrower of all time.  Of course, several women on that same list also qualified for the final, including world record holder and 2016 non-Russian world leader Barbora Špotáková.  Vera Rebrik had thrown 67.30 in February, but Russia was on suspension.

Flor Ruiz started the final round with a 61.54 m.  Two throws later Tatsiana Khaladovich raised the stakes to 62.68 m.  Two throws later Andrejczyk displaced Ruiz with a 61.92.  Sunette Viljoen moved on top with a 64.92 m.  Near the top of the second round, Kathryn Mitchell almost matched it with a 64.36 to move into silver position.  2015 World silver medalist Lü Huihui moved into bronze position with a 63.50 m that lasted until the end of the round when two-time defending champion Špotáková moved into the bronze position with a 63.73 m.  Khaladovich came back in the third round with a 64.60 m to move into the silver spot.  After the field dropped off returning bronze medalist Linda Stahl, 21 year old Sara Kolak threw  to rocket from sixth to first.  As second thrower in the fifth round, Andrejczyk threw 64.78 m to leapfrog from seventh to bronze medal position.  That only lasted a few throwers until Špotáková threw 2 cm further.

For Kolak, whose previous medal collection included the bronze medal from the 2016 European Championships, it was a new Croatian National Record, beating the 64.30 m she set in qualifying, which beat the 63.50 she threw winning the European bronze. Prior to 2016, her best was still the national record, but was a 57.79 from 2013, improving  in just 5 months.  Kolak moved into the #20 position on the all-time list.

The following evening the medals were presented by Li Lingwei, IOC member, China and Alberto Juantorena, Vice President of the IAAF.

Schedule
All times are Brasília Time (UTC−3).

Records
, the existing World and Olympic records were as follows.

The following national records were established during the competition:

Results

Qualifying round
Qualification rule: qualification standard 63.00m (Q) or at least best 12 qualified (q).

Final

References

Women's javelin throw
2016
2016 in women's athletics
Women's events at the 2016 Summer Olympics